Arion vejdorskyi or Arion vejdowskyi is a taxon with unclear taxonomic position and probably a synonym for other species. It was described as a species of air-breathing land slug, a shell-less terrestrial gastropod mollusk in the family Arionidae, the roundback slugs.

Synonyms 
This slug was described from the Czech Republic by J. Babor & J. Košťál in 1893 in Jarov near Závist as Arion (Microarion) vejdovskýi.

It is also mentioned in other works:
 Arion (Microarion) vejdovskýi J. Babor & J. Košťál, 1893
 Arion vejdowskyi Babor & Kostal, 1893
 Arion vejdorskyi

Distribution
This slug was described from the Czech Republic.

It is not mentioned in recent lists of molluscs recorded in the Czech Republic but it is still mentioned in various internet pages and in databases (see above for references).

It is an endangered species, occurring on the IUCN Red List of Threatened Species with the mention DD (Data Deficient).

Biotope 
 wetland woods with alder (Alnus)

References

Arion (gastropod)
Controversial taxa
Gastropods described in 1893
Taxonomy articles created by Polbot